The Maritime Museum of Finland is a museum in Kotka, Finland.

See also 
 Kotka Maretarium

External links 
 The Maritime Museum of Finland Finnish National Board of Antiquities 

Maritime museums in Finland
Kotka
Museums in Kymenlaakso